Vamp most commonly refers to:
 Vamp (shoe), the upper part of a shoe
 Vamp (woman), a seductress or femme fatale; derived from "vampire"
 Vamp (music), a repeating musical figure or accompaniment

Vamp or vamps may also refer to:

Science and technology
 Value Added Information Medical Products (VAMP), former name of the General Practice Research Database
 Vesicle-associated membrane protein, a family of proteins
 The VAMP regimen, a chemotherapy regimen for the treatment of low-risk childhood Hodgkin lymphoma
 Project Vamp, a U.S. Navy hydrologic survey
 V.A.M.P. (G.I. Joe), a toy vehicle

Vehicles
 Venus Atmospheric Maneuverable Platform (VAMP), an inflatable robotic aircraft for Venus
 VaMP, the first autonomous car that drove long distances in traffic
 "Vamps", short for De Havilland Vampire plane in Rhodesia

Music
 Vamp (band), a Norwegian folk music band
 Vamps (band), a Japanese rock band formed in 2008
 The Vamps (Australian band), formed in 1965
 The Vamps (British band), a band formed in 2012
 Vamps (album), the 2009 self-titled debut album of the Japanese band Vamps
 DJ Yung Vamp (born 1995), a Belgian DJ and record producer
 Playboi Carti (born 1996), American rapper known as King Vamp

Characters
 Vamp (comics)
 Vamp, a character in the Metal Gear series
 Vamp (Gobots), a character from Gobots

Film, television and theatre
 Vamp (film), 1986 vampire film
 Vamps (film), 2012 horror-comedy film
 Vamp (TV series), a Brazilian telenovela
 The Vamp, a 1955 musical comedy
 The Vamp (film), a lost 1918 silent film wartime comedy-drama
 Theda Bara (1885–1955), American silent film actress nicknamed "The Vamp"
 Ivana Vamp, Italian drag queen

Other
 Vamp (firefighter), a slang term for a volunteer firefighter in the United States
 Vamp Creek, a river in Manitoba, Canada
 Vamp Building, a building in Lynn, Massachusetts, U.S.
 Seattle Vamps, a women's ice hockey team
 Vamp!, a light novel series by Ryōgo Narita

See also
 
 
 Vampire (disambiguation)
 Vampirella, a fictional character